The terms email controversy or email scandal might refer to any of the following:

Okinawa email controversy, US Military (2001)
Climatic Research Unit email controversy, International science (2001)
Bush White House email controversy, US politics (2007)
Lee Abrams email controversy, US media (2010)
Hillary Clinton email controversy, US politics (2015)
Shiva Ayyadurai email controversy, US media (2016)